Sehirinae is a subfamily of burrowing bugs belonging to the family Cydnidae.

Genera

Tribus Amaurocorini Wagner, 1963
 Amaurocoris Stål, 1865
 Angra Schumacher, 1913
 Linospa Signoret, 1881

Tribus Sehirini Amyot & Serville, 1843
 Adomerus Mulsant & Rey, 1866
 Canthophorus Mulsant & Rey, 1866
 Crocistethus Fieber, 1860
 Exosehirus Wagner, 1963
 Lalervis Signoret, 1881
 Legnotus Schiødte, 1848
 Ochetostethomorpha Schumacher, 1913
 Ochetostethus Fieber, 1860
 Sehirus Amyot & Serville, 1843
 Singeria Wagner, 1955
 Tacolus Schouteden, 1910
 Tritomegas Amyot & Serville, 1843

References

External links
 

Hemiptera subfamilies
Cydnidae